The 1999–2000 NBA season was the Raptors' fifth season in the National Basketball Association. The Raptors received the fifth overall pick in the 1999 NBA draft from the Denver Nuggets, and selected high school basketball star Jonathan Bender, but soon traded him to the Indiana Pacers in exchange for Antonio Davis, and signed free agents Muggsy Bogues and three-point specialist Dell Curry. In their first full season playing at the Air Canada Centre, the Raptors got off to a 12–6 start, but then lost five of their next six games. However, the team got better as the season progressed, winning seven straight games between February and March, and holding a 26–21 record at the All-Star break. At midseason, the team traded Alvin Williams to the Boston Celtics in exchange for Danny Fortson, but the trade was voided due to Williams failing his physical exam; Williams only played 55 games this season due to knee injuries. The Raptors improved and qualified for their first playoff appearance with a 45–37 record, finishing third in the Central Division.

Second-year star Vince Carter led the team in scoring, averaging 25.7 points, 5.8 rebounds and 1.3 steals per game. He also won the Slam Dunk Contest in Oakland, and was selected for the 2000 NBA All-Star Game, while his cousin Tracy McGrady provided the team with 15.4 points, 6.3 rebounds and 1.9 blocks per game, and Doug Christie contributed 12.4 points, 4.4 assists and 1.4 steals per game. In addition, Davis averaged 11.5 points, 8.8 rebounds and 1.3 blocks per game, while Kevin Willis provided with 7.6 points and 6.1 rebounds per game off the bench, and Charles Oakley contributed 6.8 points and 6.9 rebounds per game. Carter also finished in tenth place in Most Valuable Player voting, while McGrady finished tied in third place in Sixth Man of the Year voting, and in fifth place in Most Improved Player voting.

However, in the postseason, the Raptors were swept in the Eastern Conference First Round by the New York Knicks in three straight games. Following the season, McGrady was traded to the Orlando Magic, while Christie was dealt to the Sacramento Kings, Dee Brown signed as a free agent with the Magic, and head coach Butch Carter was fired.

Carter was fired on June 13, 2000 after the organization decided they wanted a return of "stability" to the franchise. In his last season as coach of the Raptors, he invited friend and rap star Percy Miller, otherwise known as Master P, to the pre-season training camp to try out for the team. Carter claimed it was an attempt to deflect media attention away from Vince Carter, but was criticized for trying to draw attention to himself and his friendship with Miller. Carter also released a book where he claimed that his coach at Indiana, Bobby Knight, had launched into a racist tirade during practice, which Knight denied.

Carter was involved in public feuds with stars Vince Carter and Tracy McGrady, limiting their minutes because he didn't want to burn them out in their young careers. Carter also had an off-court feud with his ex-wife. During the opening round of the 2000 NBA Playoffs against the Knicks, Knicks center and former Raptors player Marcus Camby, who had played under Carter during the season half of the 1997–98 season, made what Carter considered an inflammatory remark about Carter by calling him a "liar", and Carter decided to file a $5-million defamation suit against him for what he said were inaccurate statements. NBA Deputy Commissioner Russ Granik believed it was a frivolous suit and criticized Carter for filing it, which led to Carter dropping the suit. In his last few weeks as Raptors coach, Butch Carter made attempts to ouster friend Glen Grunwald as General Manager and was cited as one of the reasons why Tracy McGrady decided to leave the team and sign with the Orlando Magic. The Raptors organization, players, and fans all had decided that Carter's off-court issues were too much of a distraction for the team going forward.

This season saw the Raptors change their uniforms adding side panels to their jerseys and shorts. The home jerseys remained in use until 2006, while the road jerseys lasted until 2003, where the city name "Toronto" was replaced with the team name "Raptors" on the front of their jerseys.

NBA Draft

Roster

Regular season

Standings

Record vs. opponents

Game log

|- bgcolor="ffcccc"
| 1
| November 2
| Boston
| 
| Doug Christie (20)
| Doug Christie, Kevin Willis (7)
| Muggsy Bogues (5)
| Air Canada Centre17,711
| 0-1 
|- bgcolor="bbffbb"
| 2
| November 4
| Miami
| 
| Doug Christie (28)
| Antonio Davis (13)
| Charles Oakley (7)
| Air Canada Centre16,389
| 1-1 
|- bgcolor="bbffbb"
| 3
| November 5
| @ New Jersey
| 
| Vince Carter (26)
| Tracy McGrady, Charles Oakley, Kevin Willis (9)
| Tracy McGrady (4)
| Continental Airlines Arena15,517
| 2-1 
|- bgcolor="bbffbb"
| 4
| November 7
| Charlotte
| 
| Vince Carter (25)
| Antonio Davis (12)
| Muggsy Bogues (11)
| Air Canada Centre16,658
| 3-1 
|- bgcolor="bbffbb"
| 5
| November 11
| @ Detroit
| 
| Doug Christie (24)
| Kevin Willis (13)
| Muggsy Bogues (7)
| The Palace of Auburn Hills13,157
| 4-1 
|- bgcolor="ffcccc"
| 6
| November 14
| Philadelphia
| 
| Vince Carter (27)
| Vince Carter (11)
| Vince Carter (5)
| Air Canada Centre16,661
| 4-2 
|- bgcolor="bbffbb"
| 7
| November 16
| Detroit
| 
| Antonio Davis (24)
| Antonio Davis (15)
| Muggsy Bogues (6)
| Air Canada Centre14,273
| 5-2 
|- bgcolor="ffcccc"
| 8
| November 18
| @ Washington
| 
| Vince Carter (23)
| Vince Carter (11)
| Charles Oakley (6)
| MCI Center12,134
| 5-3 
|- bgcolor="bbffbb"
| 9
| November 19
| L.A. Clippers
| 
| Antonio Davis (20)
| Charles Oakley (8)
| Doug Christie, Tracy McGrady (5)
| Air Canada Centre16,368
| 6-3 
|- bgcolor="bbffbb"
| 10
| November 21
| @ L.A. Lakers
| 
| Vince Carter (34)
| Vince Carter (13)
| Dee Brown, Vince Carter (4)
| Staples Center18,676
| 7-3 
|- bgcolor="ffcccc"
| 11
| November 23
| @ Phoenix
| 
| Vince Carter (19)
| Vince Carter, Antonio Davis, Kevin Willis (7)
| Dee Brown, Charles Oakley (5)
| America West Arena18,718
| 7-4 
|- bgcolor="ffcccc"
| 12
| November 24
| @ Denver
| 
| Vince Carter (16)
| Vince Carter, Kevin Willis (8)
| Doug Christie (5)
| Pepsi Center13,624
| 7-5 
|- bgcolor="bbffbb"
| 13
| November 26
| @ Utah
| 
| Vince Carter (18)
| Charles Oakley, Kevin Willis (9)
| Vince Carter (4)
| Delta Center19,771
| 8-5 
|- bgcolor="bbffbb"
| 14
| November 27
| @ Golden State
| 
| Antonio Davis (28)
| Tracy McGrady (7)
| Doug Christie, Tracy McGrady, Charles Oakley (4)
| The Arena in Oakland12,251
| 9-5 
|- bgcolor="ffcccc"
| 15
| November 30
| Atlanta
| 
| Antonio Davis (16)
| Antonio Davis (12)
| Dee Brown (5)
| Air Canada Centre16,862
| 9-6

|- bgcolor="bbffbb"
| 16
| December 3
| Washington
| 
| Vince Carter (23)
| Charles Oakley (9)
| Charles Oakley (7)
| Air Canada Centre15,787
| 10-6 
|- bgcolor="bbffbb"
| 17
| December 5
| San Antonio
| 
| Vince Carter (39)
| Charles Oakley (11)
| Doug Christie (9)
| Air Canada Centre18,455
| 11-6 
|- bgcolor="bbffbb"
| 18
| December 7
| Cleveland
| 
| Vince Carter (32)
| Charles Oakley (9)
| Muggsy Bogues (8)
| Air Canada Centre15,162
| 12-6 
|- bgcolor="ffcccc"
| 19
| December 10
| Milwaukee
| 
| Vince Carter (25)
| Kevin Willis (10)
| Doug Christie (6)
| Air Canada Centre17,963
| 12-7 
|- bgcolor="ffcccc"
| 20
| December 12
| Utah
| 
| Vince Carter, Kevin Willis (16)
| Antonio Davis, Kevin Willis (10)
| Dee Brown, Vince Carter, Charles Oakley (3)
| Air Canada Centre18,163
| 12-8 
|- bgcolor="bbffbb"
| 21
| December 14
| Indiana
| 
| Vince Carter (24)
| Antonio Davis (14)
| Tracy McGrady, Charles Oakley, Alvin Williams (6)
| Air Canada Centre15,774
| 13-8 
|- bgcolor="ffcccc"
| 22
| December 15
| @ Philadelphia
| 
| Vince Carter (19)
| Antonio Davis (18)
| Dee Brown, Tracy McGrady (6)
| First Union Center15,421
| 13-9 
|- bgcolor="ffcccc"
| 23
| December 17
| @ Orlando
| 
| Vince Carter (23)
| Antonio Davis (13)
| Tracy McGrady (6)
| Orlando Arena13,481
| 13-10 
|- bgcolor="ffcccc"
| 24
| December 19
| L.A. Lakers
| 
| Vince Carter (29)
| Antonio Davis (16)
| Dee Brown (5)
| Air Canada Centre19,800
| 13-11 
|- bgcolor="bbffbb"
| 25
| December 21
| New Jersey
| 
| Vince Carter (24)
| Kevin Willis (10)
| Alvin Williams (12)
| Air Canada Centre18,677
| 14-11 
|- bgcolor="ffcccc"
| 26
| December 22
| @ New York
| 
| Vince Carter (36)
| Antonio Davis (17)
| Muggsy Bogues, Doug Christie (4)
| Madison Square Garden19,763
| 14-12 
|- bgcolor="bbffbb"
| 27
| December 26
| @ Cleveland
| 
| Vince Carter (36)
| Antonio Davis, Charles Oakley (10)
| Vince Carter (8)
| Gund Arena14,135
| 15-12 
|- bgcolor="bbffbb"
| 28
| December 28
| @ Houston
| 
| Vince Carter (35)
| Vince Carter (12)
| Muggsy Bogues, Alvin Williams (5)
| Compaq Center16,285
| 16-12 
|- bgcolor="bbffbb"
| 29
| December 30
| @ Dallas
| 
| Tracy McGrady (24)
| Antonio Davis (15)
| Vince Carter (8)
| Reunion Arena16,490
| 17-12

|- bgcolor="ffcccc"
| 30
| January 4
| Portland
| 
| Tracy McGrady (18)
| Kevin Willis (8)
| Doug Christie, Tracy McGrady (4)
| Air Canada Centre19,800
| 17-13 
|- bgcolor="bbffbb"
| 31
| January 6
| Sacramento
| 
| Charles Oakley (20)
| Charles Oakley (16)
| Alvin Williams (10)
| Air Canada Centre19,800
| 18-13 
|- bgcolor="ffcccc"
| 32
| January 7
| @ Atlanta
| 
| Vince Carter (34)
| Vince Carter, Charles Oakley, Kevin Willis (7)
| Doug Christie (5)
| Philips Arena14,452
| 18-14 
|- bgcolor="ffcccc"
| 33
| January 9
| Vancouver
| 
| Vince Carter, Antonio Davis (20)
| Vince Carter (10)
| Vince Carter, Charles Oakley (6)
| Air Canada Centre19,188
| 18-15 
|- bgcolor="ffcccc"
| 34
| January 11
| @ Washington
| 
| Vince Carter (19)
| Antonio Davis (15)
| Muggsy Bogues (6)
| MCI Center13,610
| 18-16 
|- bgcolor="bbffbb"
| 35
| January 12
| Orlando
| 
| Vince Carter (30)
| Antonio Davis (9)
| Vince Carter (9)
| Air Canada Centre17,241
| 19-16 
|- bgcolor="bbffbb"
| 36
| January 14
| Milwaukee
| 
| Vince Carter (47)
| Charles Oakley (12)
| Doug Christie (8)
| Air Canada Centre19,246
| 20-16 
|- bgcolor="ffcccc"
| 37
| January 15
| @ Milwaukee
| 
| Doug Christie (31)
| Kevin Willis (12)
| Muggsy Bogues, Vince Carter (5)
| Bradley Center18,717
| 20-17 
|- bgcolor="ffcccc"
| 38
| January 17
| @ Charlotte
| 
| Vince Carter (24)
| Michael Stewart (8)
| Vince Carter (6)
| Charlotte Coliseum20,278
| 20-18 
|- bgcolor="ffcccc"
| 39
| January 19
| @ Boston
| 
| Vince Carter (20)
| Charles Oakley (10)
| Muggsy Bogues, Alvin Williams (5)
| FleetCenter16,124
| 20-19 
|- bgcolor="bbffbb"
| 40
| January 23
| Seattle
| 
| Antonio Davis, Tracy McGrady (17)
| Kevin Willis (12)
| Doug Christie (6)
| Air Canada Centre19,800
| 21-19 
|- bgcolor="bbffbb"
| 41
| January 26
| Washington
| 
| Vince Carter (26)
| Kevin Willis (9)
| Charles Oakley (8)
| Air Canada Centre17,582
| 22-19 
|- bgcolor="bbffbb"
| 42
| January 28
| Miami
| 
| Vince Carter (23)
| Antonio Davis (12)
| Charles Oakley (7)
| Air Canada Centre19,800
| 23-19 
|- bgcolor="bbffbb"
| 43
| January 29
| @ Chicago
| 
| Vince Carter (22)
| Doug Christie, Antonio Davis, Kevin Willis (6)
| Doug Christie (9)
| United Center22,104
| 24-19

|- bgcolor="ffcccc"
| 44
| February 3
| @ San Antonio
| 
| Tracy McGrady (21)
| Antonio Davis (8)
| Doug Christie, Charles Oakley (5)
| Alamodome19,048
| 24-20 
|- bgcolor="bbffbb"
| 45
| February 5
| @ Milwaukee
| 
| Vince Carter (30)
| Vince Carter (11)
| Charles Oakley (7)
| Bradley Center18,717
| 25-20 
|- bgcolor="bbffbb"
| 46
| February 8
| Atlanta
| 
| Vince Carter (36)
| Antonio Davis, Kevin Willis (9)
| Muggsy Bogues (12)
| Air Canada Centre16,636
| 26-20 
|- bgcolor="ffcccc"
| 47
| February 9
| @ Detroit
| 
| Vince Carter (34)
| Vince Carter (13)
| Vince Carter, Charles Oakley (4)
| The Palace of Auburn Hills17,710
| 26-21 
|- bgcolor="bbffbb"
| 48
| February 15
| New York
| 
| Vince Carter (29)
| Antonio Davis (14)
| Doug Christie (13)
| Air Canada Centre19,800
| 27-21 
|- bgcolor="ffcccc"
| 49
| February 16
| @ Indiana
| 
| Vince Carter (21)
| Antonio Davis (13)
| Doug Christie (6)
| Conseco Fieldhouse18,345
| 27-22 
|- bgcolor="ffcccc"
| 50
| February 18
| Denver
| 
| Vince Carter (31)
| Muggsy Bogues, Kevin Willis (8)
| Muggsy Bogues (5)
| Air Canada Centre17,570
| 27-23 
|- bgcolor="ffcccc"
| 51
| February 20
| Dallas
| 
| Vince Carter (24)
| Antonio Davis (8)
| Vince Carter, Doug Christie (7)
| Air Canada Centre19,800
| 27-24 
|- bgcolor="bbffbb"
| 52
| February 23
| @ New York
| 
| Vince Carter (33)
| Vince Carter (9)
| Vince Carter (9)
| Madison Square Garden19,763
| 28-24 
|- bgcolor="ffcccc"
| 53
| February 25
| Minnesota
| 
| Vince Carter (23)
| Tracy McGrady (9)
| Doug Christie, Haywoode Workman (4)
| Air Canada Centre19,800
| 28-25 
|- bgcolor="bbffbb"
| 54
| February 27
| Phoenix
| 
| Vince Carter (51)
| Antonio Davis (11)
| Doug Christie (7)
| Air Canada Centre19,800
| 29-25 
|- bgcolor="bbffbb"
| 55
| February 29
| Chicago
| 
| Vince Carter (26)
| Tracy McGrady (15)
| Doug Christie (7)
| Air Canada Centre18,232
| 30-25

|- bgcolor="bbffbb"
| 56
| March 1
| @ Boston
| 
| Vince Carter (28)
| Tracy McGrady (11)
| Tracy McGrady (6)
| FleetCenter17,198
| 31-25 
|- bgcolor="bbffbb"
| 57
| March 3
| Boston
| 
| Vince Carter (30)
| Vince Carter (7)
| Vince Carter (7)
| Air Canada Centre19,437
| 32-25 
|- bgcolor="bbffbb"
| 58
| March 5
| @ Vancouver
| 
| Vince Carter (28)
| Tracy McGrady (10)
| Muggsy Bogues (7)
| General Motors Place19,193
| 33-25 
|- bgcolor="bbffbb"
| 59
| March 6
| @ Portland
| 
| Vince Carter (35)
| Kevin Willis (8)
| Vince Carter, Doug Christie (5)
| Rose Garden20,516
| 34-25 
|- bgcolor="bbffbb"
| 60
| March 8
| @ L.A. Clippers
| 
| Vince Carter (23)
| Antonio Davis (11)
| Vince Carter (5)
| Staples Center18,176
| 35-25 
|- bgcolor="ffcccc"
| 61
| March 10
| @ Sacramento
| 
| Vince Carter (25)
| Antonio Davis (15)
| Doug Christie (4)
| ARCO Arena17,317
| 35-26 
|- bgcolor="bbffbb"
| 62
| March 12
| @ Seattle
| 
| Vince Carter (34)
| Kevin Willis (13)
| Tracy McGrady (6)
| KeyArena17,072
| 36-26 
|- bgcolor="bbffbb"
| 63
| March 14
| Golden State
| 
| Vince Carter (23)
| Kevin Willis (15)
| Muggsy Bogues (7)
| Air Canada Centre19,800
| 37-26 
|- bgcolor="bbffbb"
| 64
| March 17
| Orlando
| 
| Vince Carter (30)
| Tracy McGrady (13)
| Doug Christie (7)
| Air Canada Centre19,985
| 38-26 
|- bgcolor="bbffbb"
| 65
| March 19
| Houston
| 
| Vince Carter (37)
| Kevin Willis (13)
| Doug Christie (5)
| Air Canada Centre19,876
| 39-26 
|- bgcolor="ffcccc"
| 66
| March 21
| New Jersey
| 
| Vince Carter (23)
| Antonio Davis, Tracy McGrady (12)
| Doug Christie (7)
| Air Canada Centre19,800
| 39-27 
|- bgcolor="ffcccc"
| 67
| March 22
| @ Philadelphia
| 
| Vince Carter (26)
| Antonio Davis (9)
| Doug Christie (8)
| First Union Center20,753
| 39-28 
|- bgcolor="ffcccc"
| 68
| March 24
| Charlotte
| 
| Vince Carter (18)
| Doug Christie (11)
| Doug Christie, Tracy McGrady (4)
| Air Canada Centre19,800
| 39-29 
|- bgcolor="ffcccc"
| 69
| March 26
| @ Minnesota
| 
| Vince Carter (38)
| Vince Carter, Antonio Davis (7)
| Tracy McGrady (8)
| Target Center19,902
| 39-30 
|- bgcolor="bbffbb"
| 70
| March 28
| @ Cleveland
| 
| Vince Carter (19)
| Vince Carter, Tracy McGrady, Charles Oakley (8)
| Vince Carter (6)
| Gund Arena20,562
| 40-30 
|- bgcolor="ffcccc"
| 71
| March 30
| @ New Jersey
| 
| Vince Carter (39)
| Antonio Davis (13)
| Vince Carter (7)
| Continental Airlines Arena18,493
| 40-31 
|- bgcolor="ffcccc"
| 72
| March 31
| @ Charlotte
| 
| Vince Carter (31)
| Tracy McGrady (13)
| Muggsy Bogues (7)
| Charlotte Coliseum23,799
| 40-32

|- bgcolor="ffcccc"
| 73
| April 2
| Indiana
| 
| Tracy McGrady (24)
| Antonio Davis (11)
| Doug Christie, Tracy McGrady (5)
| Air Canada Centre19,800
| 40-33 
|- bgcolor="ffcccc"
| 74
| April 4
| Detroit
| 
| Tracy McGrady (28)
| Antonio Davis (12)
| Muggsy Bogues, Vince Carter, Tracy McGrady (5)
| Air Canada Centre19,800
| 40-34 
|- bgcolor="bbffbb"
| 75
| April 7
| @ Atlanta
| 
| Vince Carter (23)
| Antonio Davis (11)
| Vince Carter (9)
| Philips Arena19,499
| 41-34 
|- bgcolor="bbffbb"
| 76
| April 8
| @ Chicago
| 
| Dee Brown, Tracy McGrady (19)
| Charles Oakley (7)
| Muggsy Bogues (8)
| United Center22,137
| 42-34 
|- bgcolor="bbffbb"
| 77
| April 10
| Cleveland
| 
| Vince Carter (31)
| Vince Carter (11)
| Vince Carter (10)
| Air Canada Centre19,800
| 43-34 
|- bgcolor="ffcccc"
| 78
| April 12
| @ Indiana
| 
| Vince Carter (28)
| Tracy McGrady (14)
| Tracy McGrady (8)
| Conseco Fieldhouse18,345
| 43-35 
|- bgcolor="bbffbb"
| 79
| April 14
| New York
| 
| Vince Carter (34)
| Tracy McGrady (9)
| Muggsy Bogues, Vince Carter (6)
| Air Canada Centre19,800
| 44-35 
|- bgcolor="bbffbb"
| 80
| April 16
| Chicago
| 
| Vince Carter (25)
| Antonio Davis (9)
| Tracy McGrady (5)
| Air Canada Centre19,800
| 45-35 
|- bgcolor="ffcccc"
| 81
| April 18
| @ Miami
| 
| Vince Carter (17)
| Charles Oakley (9)
| Doug Christie (4)
| American Airlines Arena19,710
| 45-36 
|- bgcolor="ffcccc"
| 82
| April 19
| @ Orlando
| 
| Antonio Davis, Tracy McGrady (14)
| Michael Stewart (11)
| Doug Christie (5)
| TD Waterhouse Centre16,545
| 45-37

Playoffs

Game log

|- align="center" bgcolor="#ffcccc"
| 1
| April 23
| @ New York
| L 88–92
| Tracy McGrady (25)
| Kevin Willis (11)
| Carter, Oakley (6)
| Madison Square Garden19,763
| 0–1
|- align="center" bgcolor="#ffcccc"
| 2
| April 26
| @ New York
| L 83–84
| Vince Carter (27)
| Kevin Willis (10)
| Vince Carter (5)
| Madison Square Garden19,763
| 0–2
|- align="center" bgcolor="#ffcccc"
| 3
| April 30
| New York
| L 80–87
| Antonio Davis (18)
| Charles Oakley (14)
| Vince Carter (8)
| Air Canada Centre19,996
| 0–3
|-

Vince Carter
Vince Carter was selected to an All-Star Team for the first time, and showcased his athleticism and dunking abilities in the 2000 NBA Slam Dunk Contest. He won the contest by performing an array of dunks including a 360° windmill, a between the legs, and an "elbow dunk." Though he has not competed in the dunk contest since, Carter has been voted into the Eastern Conference NBA All-Star Team starting lineup several times through fan balloting.

Player statistics

Regular season

* Statistics include only games with the Raptors

Playoffs

Award winners
 Vince Carter, Slam Dunk Champion

Transactions

References

External links
 1999–2000 Toronto Raptors season at Basketball Reference
 1999–2000 Toronto Raptors season at Database Basketball

Toronto Raptors seasons
Toronto
Tor